Kinesin light chain 4 is a protein that in humans is encoded by the KLC4 gene.

References

Further reading